The Nissan QD engine, successor to the Nissan TD engine, was an inline four-cylinder overhead valve diesel produced from the mid-1990s through 2000, with a turbocharger used on three variants, the QD32ETi(Elgrand and Terrano) QD32T and Qd32Ti(intercooled) in Chinese Markets (Nissan Cabstar) . It was replaced by the Nissan ZD engine.

QD32

QD321
 @ 3600 rpm
 @ 2000 rpm
Nissan Homy / Nissan Caravan (E24) 1996–2001 (Automatic transmission)

QD35
 @ 3800 rpm
 @ 2000 rpm
Nissan Homy / Nissan Caravan (E24) 1996–2001 (Manual transmission)

QD323
 @ 3900 rpm
 @ 2000 rpm
Datsun Truck (D22) 1997–2002

QD324
 @ 3600 rpm
 @ 2000 rpm
Nissan Atlas (F23) 1997–2004

QD325
 @ 3000 rpm
 @ 2000 rpm
Nissan Atlas (F23) 2004–2007

QD32ETi
 @ 3600 rpm
 @ 2000 rpm

Nissan Terrano (Rpm System) 1996–1999 
Nissan Elgrand (E50) 1997–1999

CYQD29Ti

See also
 List of Nissan engines

QD
Diesel engines by model
Straight-four engines